The 2018 Formula 4 South East Asia Championship season was the third season of the Formula 4 South East Asia Championship. It began on 7 July at the Sepang International Circuit and finished on 1 December at the same venue.

Drivers 
The provisional driver entry list was released on 27 April 2018.

Calendar 
The calendar for the 2018 season expanded upon the previous season. The Clark International Speedway round in the Philippines was discontinued and replaced with the Madras Motor Race Track in Chennai, India.

Championship standings

The series follows the standard F1 points scoring system with the addition of 1 point for fastest lap and 3 points for pole. The best 18 results out of 24 races counted towards the championship.

The fastest qualifying laps determine the grid positions for race 1. The finishing positions of the entire field in race 1 are reversed to determine the grid positions for race 2. The finishing positions of the entire field in race 2 are reversed to determine the grid positions for race 3.

Points were awarded as follows:

Drivers' standings

Rookie Champions

References

External links 

 

South East Asia
Formula 4 South East Asia Championship
Formula 4 South East Asia Championship
South East Asia F4
2018 in Malaysian motorsport